Adel Ibrahim Moustafa (18 January 1930 – 28 October 2005) was an Egyptian wrestler. He competed at the 1948 Olympics in the welterweight freestyle wrestling and at the 1952 Olympics in the middleweight Greco-Roman event, but was eliminated in the preliminary bouts in both games. A 1955 Mediterranean Games Champion, he was one of three sons of Ibrahim Moustafa, a 1928 Olympic gold medalist in Greco-Roman wrestling.

References

External links
 

1930 births
2005 deaths
Wrestlers at the 1948 Summer Olympics
Wrestlers at the 1952 Summer Olympics
Egyptian male sport wrestlers
Olympic wrestlers of Egypt
20th-century Egyptian people